Michael Connelly (born 1956) is an American author.

Michael Connelly may also refer to:

Michael Connelly (Illinois politician), American politician
Michael Connelly (Medal of Honor) (1843–1881), American Civil War sailor and Medal of Honor recipient
Michael Connelly (New Zealand politician) (1887–1970), politician and trade unionist
Mick Connelly (1916–2003), New Zealand politician
Mike Connelly (born 1935), American football player

See also
Michael Conneely (born 1949), Irish hurler
Michael Connolly (disambiguation)